KWEX-DT (channel 41) is a television station in San Antonio, Texas, United States, broadcasting the Spanish-language Univision network. It is owned and operated by TelevisaUnivision alongside Blanco-licensed UniMás outlet KNIC-DT (channel 17). Both stations share studios on Network Boulevard in Northwest San Antonio; KWEX operates a secondary studio facility at the Texas A&M–San Antonio Educational and Cultural Arts Center on South Santa Rosa in downtown San Antonio. The station's transmitter is located off US 181 in northwest Wilson County (northeast of Elmendorf).

History

The station first signed on the air on June 10, 1955 as KCOR-TV. The callsign was taken from its radio sister station KCOR (1350 AM), which itself was named for Raoul Cortez, the owner and pioneer of the first full-time Spanish-language radio and television stations in the United States by the Radio Corporation of America (RCA). KCOR-TV was also the first Spanish-language commercial television station in the U.S., as well as the first television station in south Texas to broadcast on the UHF band. The station originally operated from studio facilities located on Network Boulevard (southwest of the present-day I-10) on the city's northwest side.

In 1962, after years of losses, Cortez sold the station to a consortium led by his son-in-law Emilio Nicolas, Renold Anselmo, Emilio Azcarraga Vidaurreta, Julian Kaufman and Frank Fouce. With the change in ownership, the station changed its call letters to KUAL-TV that year. Since the station's beginnings, Nicolas had worked side by side with Cortez, not only running the station, but producing many of channel 41's variety programs. Azcarraga's family owned Mexico's highest-rated television network, Telesistema Mexicano (forerunner of Televisa), allowing KUAL to gain stronger programming. Nicolas made the station a financial success, and in late 1962 Nicolas and his partners built their second television station, KMEX-TV in Los Angeles. The two stations, with KUAL as the de facto founding station of the entire network, formed the nuclei of the first Spanish language television network in the United States; later that year, the station changed its calls to KWEX-TV, as the station became a charter affiliate of the Spanish International Network (which was relaunched as Univision in 1987).

On July 29, 2013, KWEX relocated from its longtime Durango Boulevard studios in San Antonio's Southtown district to a new  facility on Network Boulevard. The facility, which was constructed over the course of six months, cost $10 million to build and includes expanded master control and newsroom space, two studios for production of its newscasts and local programs (one of which includes a kitchen set used for food segments); Univision's San Antonio radio cluster—KCOR, KBBT (98.5 FM), KCOR-FM (95.1 FM), KROM (92.9 FM), KXTN-FM (107.5)—relocated their operations to the facility in late summer 2013. Plans called for the former studio facility to be torn down with an apartment complex being built on the property, a plan that was opposed by the San Antonio Conservation Society and the Texas Historical Commission, who proposed that the building be restored and incorporated into the new development.

The new facility opened on February 18, 2014.

News operation

KWEX-DT presently broadcasts seven hours of locally produced newscasts each week (with one hour each on weekdays, Saturdays and Sundays); in addition, the station produces a series of interview segments titled Despierta San Antonio (Wake-up San Antonio), which airs at around 25 and 55 minutes past the hour during Univision's national morning program Despierta America on weekday mornings.

With the move to the new studios on Network Blvd., on July 29, 2013, KWEX-DT became the fifth television station in the San Antonio market to begin broadcasting its local newscasts in high definition.

Technical information

Subchannels
The station's digital signal is multiplexed:

Analog-to-digital conversion
KWEX-TV discontinued regular programming on its analog signal, over UHF channel 41, on June 12, 2009, the official date in which full-power television stations in the United States transitioned from analog to digital broadcasts under federal mandate. The station's digital signal relocated from its pre-transition UHF channel 39 to channel 41.

The station's former digital allocation on UHF channel 39 and their facilities were subsequently transferred in full to CBS affiliate KENS (channel 5), which shared KWEX's signal as a full 1080i high definition subchannel in 2008 and early 2009, mapping to virtual channel 5.1 due to their transitional digital channel on UHF 55 being sold to Qualcomm for their MediaFLO mobile television service. At the time, KWEX had broadcast solely in 480i standard definition, so both KENS and KWEX broadcast over digital channel 39 without any issues between the two stations.

References

External links
KWEX-DT official website
Brief history
History of the Spanish International Network

Univision network affiliates
GetTV affiliates
Grit (TV network) affiliates
Court TV affiliates
Spanish-language television stations in Texas
Television channels and stations established in 1955
Television stations in San Antonio
1955 establishments in Texas